Remi Joseph Rabenirina (born 6 March 1938) is a former Malagasy Anglican archbishop. He was Archbishop of the Church of the Province of the Indian Ocean, from 1995 to 2005.

Rabenirina was educated at the University of Madagascar. After a brief career as a school teacher, he was ordained an Anglican priest in 1967. He was parish priest at  St James’ Toamasina and then held incumbencies at  St Matthew's Antsiranana and St John's Ambohimangakely.

In 1984, he was elected Bishop of Antananarivo, retiring in 2008; and in 1995 Archbishop of the Indian Ocean, resigning in 2005. An author  he is Chevalier, Officier et Commandeur de l’Ordre National (Malagasy).

References

External links 
 Cathédrale Saint Laurent Ambohimanoro

1938 births
20th-century Anglican bishops in Africa
21st-century Anglican bishops in Africa
Anglican bishops of Antananarivo
Anglican archbishops of the Indian Ocean
20th-century Anglican archbishops
21st-century Anglican archbishops
Living people